Murochi is a rural locality (an ulus) in Kyakhtinsky District, Republic of Buryatia, Russia. The population was 339 as of 2010. There are 10 streets.

Geography 
Murochi is located 66 km east of Kyakhta (the district's administrative centre) by road. Kurort Kiran is the nearest rural locality.

References 

Rural localities in Kyakhtinsky District